Else Petersen (26 April 1910 – 28 August 2002) was a Danish film and stage actress. She appeared in 44 films between 1936 and 1993.

Partial filmography

 Maria the Maid (1936) - Alice's friend
 Flådens blå matroser (1937) - Else
 En ganske almindelig pige (1940) - Pige til prøvefilmning (uncredited)
 Wienerbarnet (1941) - Sofie
 Tyrannens Fald (1942)
 Melody of Murder (1944) - Frk. Baunsø
 The Old Mill on Mols (1953) - Frøken Ballerup
 Bruden fra Dragstrup (1955) - Husassistent
 Kristiane af Marstal (1956) - Bryllupsgæst
 Der var engang en gade (1957) - Vred kreditor på trappen
 Tre piger fra Jylland (1957) - Stuepigen Marie
 Baronessen fra benzintanken (1960) - Kokkepige (uncredited)
 Onkel Joakims hemmelighed (1967) - Middagsgæst (uncredited)
 2 - I, a Woman, Part II (1968) - Her sister
 Det var en lørdag aften (1968) - Politimands kone
 Soldaterkammerater på bjørnetjeneste (1968) - Frk. Petersen (uncredited)
 Mig og min lillebror og storsmuglerne (1968) - Anna
 The Veterinarian's Adopted Children (1968) - Fru Eriksen
 Farlig sommer (1969) - Købmandskone
 Me and My Kid Brother and Doggie (1969) - Weinholms kone
 I Tyrens tegn (1974) - Blad / Chief editor's wife
 Per (1975) - Fru Petersen
 Brand-Børge rykker ud (1976) - Postfunktionær
 I Løvens tegn (1976) - Soffy
 Affæren i Mølleby (1976) - Godtfredsens sekretær
 Agent 69 Jensen i Skorpionens tegn (1977) - Irmas veninde
 Lille spejl (1978) - Værtshusholderske Lizzie
 Agent 69 Jensen i Skyttens tegn (1978) - Kunde i rejsebureau
 Hør, var der ikke en som lo? (1978) - Bibliotekaren / Grænsevagten
 Rend mig i traditionerne (1979) - Frk. Mortensen
 Øjeblikket (1980) - Patient
 Belladonna (1981) - Kvinden i toget
 In the Middle of the Night (1984) - Ældre dame i tv-studie (uncredited)
 Den kroniske uskyld (1985) - Fransklærerinde
 Ofelia kommer til byen (1985) - Theodora
 Early Spring (1986) - Frk. Thomsens mor
 Flamberede hjerter (1986) - Fru Lynge
 Sidste akt (1987) - Sarita Myrtle
 Babette's Feast (1987) - Solveig
 Waltzing Regitze (1989) - Neighbour
 Camping (1990) - Ældre dame
 Casanova (1990) - Gammel Dame
 Europa (1991) - Old Female Assistant
 Black Harvest (1993) - Jomfru Rottbøll

External links

1910 births
2002 deaths
Danish film actresses
Actresses from Copenhagen